Gaynorsville is an unincorporated community in Sand Creek Township, Decatur County, Indiana.

History
A post office was established at Gaynorsville in 1871, and remained in operation until it was discontinued in 1904.

Geography

References

Unincorporated communities in Decatur County, Indiana
Unincorporated communities in Indiana